Someshwari River (Popularly known as Singsang chi or Simsang wari by A.chik Tribe), known as Simsang River in the Indian state of Meghalaya which originates from Nokrek Range and flows into Bangladesh.

Simsang River is a major river in the Garo Hills of Meghalaya and Netrakona District of Bangladesh. It divides the Garo Hills into two parts. Simsang River is main source of water for agricultural activities people living in the Simsang River banks. It is the longest and largest river in Garo Hills region of Meghalaya

Bangladesh
In Bangladesh it flows through the Susang-Durgapur and other areas of Netrakona District till it flows into the Kangsha River. A branch of the river flows towards Kalmakanda and meets the Balia River. Another branch of the river flows into the haor areas of Sunamganj District and flows into the Surma River It is one of Bangladesh's trans-boundary rivers.

References

External links
 
 Someshwari River : Video 

Rivers of Bangladesh
Rivers of Meghalaya
Rivers of India
Rivers of Mymensingh Division